Laphria may refer to:
 Laphria (fly), a genus of robber flies
 Laphria (festival), an ancient Greek festival for goddess Artemis